Jimmy Gardner may refer to:

 Jimmy Gardner (ice hockey) (1881–1940), Canadian professional ice hockey forward
 Jimmy Gardner (boxer) (1885–1964), Irish-American boxer
 Jimmy Gardner (actor) (1924–2010), British actor
 Jimmy Gardner (footballer) (born 1967), Scottish footballer

See also
 James Gardner (disambiguation)